The 2022 Deutschland Cup was the 33rd edition of the tournament, held between 10 and 13 November 2022.

Standings

Results
All times are local (UTC+1).

References

Deutschland Cup
2022
Deutschland Cup
Sport in Krefeld